Robert James "Bobby" Livingston (born September 3, 1982) is a former professional baseball player who played in Major League Baseball (MLB) for the Seattle Mariners and Cincinnati Reds.

Amateur career 
Livingston was originally enrolled at Estacado High School before transferring to Trinity Christian High School in Lubbock, Texas for his final year of school.  In 2001, he pitched for the Bethesda Big Train.  He had originally signed to play college baseball for the hometown Texas Tech Red Raiders before he was drafted.

Professional career

Seattle Mariners
Livingston was selected by Seattle Mariners in the 4th round (129th overall) of 2001 Major League Baseball Draft. He played in the minors for the Mariners through 2006, with two years with the AAA Tacoma Rainiers in 2005-2006. He made his Major League debut for the Mariners on April 25, 2006 against the Chicago White Sox. He pitched 1.2 innings, allowing 5 hits, 4 runs, walking 3 and striking out 1. He appeared in a total of 3 games that season in Seattle, working a total of five innings.

Cincinnati Reds
In December , he was put on waivers and claimed by the Tampa Bay Devil Rays, who quickly traded him to the Philadelphia Phillies. MLB intervened and declared the transaction to be null and void, as they judged that Tampa Bay had claimed Livingston for the sole purpose of trading him. He was then defaulted back to waivers and was claimed by the Cincinnati Reds.  He appeared in 10 games as a starting pitcher for the Reds in 2007. His record was 3-3 with a 5.27 ERA. His first career victory came on June 1 against the Colorado Rockies. On July 16, 2007, Livingston went 4-4 with an RBI tying the club record for most hits for a pitcher in a game. He spent most of 2007 & 2008 in AAA with the Louisville Bats.

Baltimore Orioles
He became a free agent at the end of the 2008 season and signed a minor league contract in January 2009 with the Baltimore Orioles. He pitched in 13 games for the AA Bowie Baysox and 3 for the AAA Norfolk Tides. On July 3, 2009, he was released by Baltimore.

Cleveland Indians
He then signed a minor league deal with the Cleveland Indians, where he pitched in nine games for the AA Akron Aeros and 1 for the AAA Columbus Clippers. He was then sent to the Pittsburgh Pirates from Cleveland on September 1, 2009 as part of a conditional deal.

Pittsburgh Pirates
He was then sent to the Pittsburgh Pirates by the Cleveland Indians as part of a conditional deal, on September 1, 2009. With the Pirates, he made one start for the AAA Indianapolis Indians.

New York Mets
On January 14, 2010, Livingston signed a minor league contract with the New York Mets. The Mets assigned him to the minor league Buffalo Bisons, where he appeared in 22 games and made 15 starts. He was 3-8 with a 5.34 ERA before he was released on July 29.

Los Angeles Dodgers
He was promptly signed by the Los Angeles Dodgers and assigned to the AAA Albuquerque Isotopes. He appeared in just three games with the Isotopes, with one start, before he was released on August 8.

Tampa Bay Rays
On August 16, 2010, Livingston signed a minor-league contract with the Tampa Bay Rays and was assigned to the AAA Durham Bulls. He pitched 5 games for the Bulls.

Mexican League
He played for Vaqueros Laguna of the Mexican League in 2011.

Atlantic League
He played with the Sugar Land Skeeters in 2012 and 2013.

References

External links

1982 births
Living people
Akron Aeros players
Albuquerque Isotopes players
American expatriate baseball players in Mexico
Baseball players from St. Louis
Bowie Baysox players
Bravos de Margarita players
Buffalo Bisons (minor league) players
Cincinnati Reds players
Columbus Clippers players
Criollos de Caguas players
Durham Bulls players
Everett AquaSox players
Gigantes de Carolina players
Gigantes del Cibao players
American expatriate baseball players in the Dominican Republic
Gulf Coast Reds players
Indianapolis Indians players
Inland Empire 66ers of San Bernardino players
Liga de Béisbol Profesional Roberto Clemente pitchers
Louisville Bats players
Major League Baseball pitchers
Mexican League baseball pitchers
Norfolk Tides players
Peoria Javelinas players
San Antonio Missions players
Sarasota Reds players
Seattle Mariners players
Sugar Land Skeeters players
Tacoma Rainiers players
Tiburones de La Guaira players
American expatriate baseball players in Venezuela
Vaqueros Laguna players
Wisconsin Timber Rattlers players